White1 is the third album by Sunn O))), released in 2003. It was the most significant departure from their original style to date. Each track was experimental in its own way, with Julian Cope reciting poetry for half of "My Wall", Norwegian lyrics sung by Runhild Gammelsæter of Thorr's Hammer as an intro to a drum machine and stoner metal bass riff in "The Gates of Ballard", and the drone track "A Shaving of the Horn that Speared You".

The lyrics of "The Gates of Ballard" come from "Håvard Hedde", a Norwegian folk song. Another metal version of "Håvard Hedde" was recorded in 1995 by the Norwegian band Storm.

In Q magazine's August issue (named the loud issue), they named White1 as the 18th loudest album of all time, just above AC/DC's Back in Black and below the Jimi Hendrix Experience's album Are You Experienced.

Track listing

Guest musicians
Julian Cope – vocals
Runhild Gammelsæter – vocals
Rex Ritter – keyboards
Joe Preston – guitars, bass guitar, programming, electronics

References

See also
White2
WHITEbox

2003 albums
Southern Lord Records albums
Sunn O))) albums